William Arthur Harbridge (March 29, 1855 – March 17, 1924), also known as "Yaller Bill", was a Major League Baseball player who split his playing time between catcher and in the outfield for five different teams during his nine-season career that lasted from  through .

Career
He began his career in the last year of the National Association and finished with the Union Association in its only year of existence.

On May 6, Bill is credited as becoming the first left-handed catcher in major league baseball history. He died in his hometown of Philadelphia at the age of 68, and was interred at Fernwood Cemetery in Fernwood, Pennsylvania.

References

External links

19th-century baseball players
Baseball players from Philadelphia
Major League Baseball catchers
Major League Baseball center fielders
Hartford Dark Blues players
Chicago White Stockings players
Troy Trojans players
Philadelphia Quakers players
Cincinnati Outlaw Reds players
1855 births
1924 deaths
Springfield (minor league baseball) players
Holyoke (minor league baseball) players
Brooklyn Atlantics (minor league) players
Washington Nationals (minor league) players
Albany (minor league baseball) players
New York Quicksteps players
Philadelphia Athletics (minor league) players
Augusta Browns players
Syracuse Stars (minor league baseball) players
Burials at Fernwood Cemetery (Lansdowne, Pennsylvania)